The Ukrainian State Film Agency (romanization: Derzhavne ahentstvo Ukrayiny z pytanʹ kino), known in short as Derzhkino, is the central executive body of cinematography in Ukraine. It was created in 2011.

Pylyp Illenko was the agency's chair from August 2014 until his resignation in August 2019.

Creation of Derzhkino 
On March 28, 2011, as a result, the State Service of Cinematography was eliminated, instead, the State Agency of Ukraine on Cinema as a central executive body, which implements state policy in the field of cinematography, was established. From August 2014 to August 2019, the Chairman of the Agency was Pylyp Illenko.

Since the creation of the State Committee, the financing of film production by the state has been significantly increased. Thus, in 2010, the financing of Ukrainian cinema amounted to UAH 24 million, and in 2011 — already 111 million UAH. In 2012, state financing of the film industry amounted to 176 million UAH.

In 2011, the First Pitching under the new rules, when the State Financing was distributed after the presentation of projects before experts and according to their estimates. Initially, Derzhkino financed 10 short tapes, and subsequently began to increase the pace and spend on Pithchigi every year. Financing for a new scheme also received young cinematographers, and names.

Ratings
Ratings issued by the Derzhkino as of the latest amendment in 2015:
ДА (Children Audience): Film aimed for children. They contain no violence or obscenity.
ЗА (General Audience): Suitable for all.
12: Suitable for children aged 12 and older; those under 12 may be admitted if accompanied by an adult as parents may find upsetting to them.
16: Not allowed for viewing by persons under 16 years of age.
18: Not allowed for viewing by persons under 18 years of age. Additionally, "18" rated features may only be screened in theaters after 18:00, and they may be broadcast on television only after 22:00.
Відмовлено (Denied, Refused): Refused a classification by the Derzhkino. Content may not be shown, advertised, or distributed anywhere in Ukraine.
Films can get rejected if they promote war, violence, cruelty, and fascism aimed at eliminating Ukraine's independence.

Formerly used
14: Suitable for children aged 14 and older; those under 14 may be admitted if accompanied by an adult.
X21: Not allowed for viewing by persons under 21 years of age. Used to indicate pornography.

Criticism
DerzhKino prioritizes funding for so-called patriotic projects. To qualify, DerzhKino requires that Ukrainian or Crimean Tatar language account for 90% of a film's total dialogue, in order to counteract the dominance of Russia's state-sponsored patriotic film industry. An article at Radio Free Europe/Radio Liberty reported that "Some have likened the Derzhkino criteria to the sort of censorship that exists in authoritarian countries like Russia".

References

External links

Film organizations in Ukraine
Motion picture rating systems
Government agencies of Ukraine
2011 establishments in Ukraine
Entertainment rating organizations